Ekaterina Aleksandrovna Kniazhnina (1746–6 June 1797) was an 18th-century Russian poet. Her surname also appears as Knyazhnina.

The daughter of Alexander Sumarokov, she was born and lived in St. Petersburg. She married Yakov Knyazhnin in 1770. She was one of the first Russian women to have poetry published in Russian journals. Kniazhnina was the hostess of an important literary salon.

Ivan Krylov wrote a parody about Kniazhnina and her husband in 1787, Prokazniki (The trouble-makers).

References 

1746 births
1797 deaths
Poets from the Russian Empire
Women writers from the Russian Empire
Russian women poets
18th-century women writers from the Russian Empire
18th-century poets from the Russian Empire
Writers from Saint Petersburg